Let's Talk About Love is a 1997 album by Celine Dion.

Let's Talk About Love may also refer to:

Music
 Let's Talk About Love (EP), by Seungri, 2013
 Let's Talk About Love (Modern Talking album), 1985
 "Let's Talk About Love", a 1962 song by Helen Shapiro
 "Parlez Moi D'Amour (Let's Talk About Love)", a 1982 song by June Pointer off the album June Pointer

Other uses
 Let's Talk About Love (film), a 1976 film by Jean-Claude Lord

See also

 
 "Let's Talk About Sex", a 1991 song by Salt-n-Pepa
 Parlez-moi d'amour (disambiguation), sometimes translated as "let's talk about love"
 Speak to me of love (disambiguation)